Baldwin High School is a public high school in suburban Pittsburgh, Pennsylvania. It is the  public school in the Pittsburgh area. The district serves the communities of: Baldwin, Whitehall and Baldwin Township. It is part of the Baldwin-Whitehall School District.

AP Courses 
Baldwin currently offers 17 Advanced placement courses. 
 
 AP English Language and Composition 
 AP English Literature and Composition
 AP World History
 AP United States History
 AP United States Government and Politics
 AP Economics
 AP Calculus AB
 AP Calculus BC
 AP Statistics
 AP Physics C
 AP Physics 1
 AP Biology
 AP Chemistry
 AP Spanish Language and Culture
 AP French Language and Culture
 AP German Language and Culture
 AP Computer Science Principles

Renovation

Beginning in 2006, Baldwin High School underwent major renovation, as it had not had any of the sort within the last 35 years.

Notable alumni

Robert Gregory Bowers – alleged perpetrator of the Pittsburgh synagogue shooting, did not graduate
John Gibson – professional NHL hockey goalie in the Anaheim Ducks organization
Michelle Rogan-Finnemore – Executive Secretary of the Council of Managers of National Antarctic Programmes
Charles Graner – former U.S. Army reservist who was convicted of war crimes in connection with the Abu Ghraib prisoner abuse scandal
Gary Greaves – American football player
Orrin Hatch - former Utah senator and President pro tempore of the U.S. Senate
Jason Pinkston – former NFL player
George Sodini – perpetrator of the 2009 Collier Township shooting
Dave Wannstedt – long-time NFL coach for the Dallas Cowboys, Chicago Bears and Miami Dolphins, former head coach for the University of Pittsburgh Panthers
Ian Wild – American football player

References

Public high schools in Pennsylvania
Schools in Allegheny County, Pennsylvania
Education in Pittsburgh area
Educational institutions established in 1939
1939 establishments in Pennsylvania